Terayama Dam is a rockfill dam located in Tochigi prefecture in Japan. The dam is used for flood control and water supply. The catchment area of the dam is 11.5 km2. The dam impounds about 16  ha of land when full and can store 2550 thousand cubic meters of water. The construction of the dam was started on 1972 and completed in 1984.

References

Dams in Tochigi Prefecture
1984 establishments in Japan